, also known as  or  is the largest Japanese life insurance company by revenue. The company was founded in 1889 as the Nippon Life Assurance Co., Inc.  In structure it is a mutual company.  It first paid policyholder dividends in 1898.

Overview
Nippon Life employs 70,519 employees and has 70,608 billion yen in assets as of 2016. The company is headquartered in Imabashi Sanchōme, Chūō-ku, Osaka, Japan.

References

External links

Company website (in Japanese)
Company website (in English)

 
Insurance companies of Japan
Mutual insurance companies
Companies based in Osaka Prefecture
Financial services companies established in 1889
1889 establishments in Japan
Japanese brands